David Neitz (born 22 January 1975), is a retired Australian rules footballer.  The strongly built centre half back who became a full forward was the longest-serving captain in the history of the Melbourne Football Club and the first Melbourne player to achieve the 300-game milestone. He is considered one of the greatest ever players to come out of the island state of Tasmania.

Neitz was born in Ulverstone, Tasmania, he was groomed as a potential Australian Football League player from the age of 15 and targeted by the recruiters at the Melbourne Football Club, entering the AFL in 1993 as a key position player, he soon became one of Melbourne's best young prospects.

In 1994, Neitz was named to his first Victorian State of Origin team, and he went one step further in 1995 by making the All-Australian team as well as the Victorian side.

After the retirement of Demons great Garry Lyon, Neitz moved to the full-forward position and began his successful run as one of the AFL's elite goal scorers. He has led Melbourne's goalkicking seven times (1996, 1997 (equal), 1999, 2002, 2003, 2004 and 2006), and in 2002 won the prestigious Coleman Medal for leading the league in goals, making him not only the first Melbourne player to do so, but also the first Melbourne player to lead the competition's goalkicking since the 1940s. On 8 April 2005, Neitz became the 40th person in VFL/AFL history to kick 500 career goals.

Neitz was appointed captain of Melbourne in 2000, and on 8 April 2005 he broke the club record for most games captained (previously held by Garry Lyon with 112 games as captain). He has been an All-Australian in 1995 and 2002, and played for Australia in the 1998 International Rules Series and 2002 International Rules Series against Ireland. In 2002, Neitz also won his first Melbourne Best and Fairest Award, the Keith 'Bluey' Truscott Medal.

On 8 April 2005, Neitz played his 250th career AFL game, and in 2006 signed a two-year contract extension seeing him through to the end of 2007. Neitz became Melbourne's all-time leading goal-kicker on 19 May 2006, surpassing Norm Smith's previous record of 546 goals. Two weeks later, he broke Robert Flower's long standing record of 272 games, making him the longest serving Demon in history. He played his 300th AFL game for the Demons in the defeat against Collingwood on 17 August 2007. He is one of only two players to play as many games for the Melbourne Football Club, the other being Nathan Jones.

Statistics

|- style="background-color: #EAEAEA"
! scope="row" style="text-align:center" | 1993
|style="text-align:center;"|
| 38 || 20 || 17 || 15 || 161 || 96 || 257 || 94 || 12 || 0.9 || 0.8 || 8.1 || 4.8 || 12.9 || 4.7 || 0.6
|-
! scope="row" style="text-align:center" | 1994
|style="text-align:center;"|
| 9 || 24 || 2 || 2 || 189 || 123 || 312 || 81 || 22 || 0.1 || 0.1 || 7.9 || 5.1 || 13.0 || 3.4 || 0.9
|- style="background-color: #EAEAEA"
! scope="row" style="text-align:center" | 1995
|style="text-align:center;"|
| 9 || 22 || 33 || 25 || 232 || 67 || 299 || 140 || 18 || 1.5 || 1.1 || 10.5 || 3.0 || 13.6 || 6.4 || 0.8
|-
! scope="row" style="text-align:center" | 1996
|style="text-align:center;"|
| 9 || 22 || 56 || 26 || 181 || 66 || 247 || 110 || 22 || 2.5 || 1.2 || 8.2 || 3.0 || 11.2 || 5.0 || 1.0
|- style="background-color: #EAEAEA"
! scope="row" style="text-align:center" | 1997
|style="text-align:center;"|
| 9 || 17 || 30 || 22 || 129 || 34 || 163 || 77 || 9 || 1.8 || 1.3 || 7.6 || 2.0 || 9.6 || 4.5 || 0.5
|-
! scope="row" style="text-align:center" | 1998
|style="text-align:center;"|
| 9 || 14 || 33 || 21 || 115 || 42 || 157 || 57 || 14 || 2.4 || 1.5 || 8.2 || 3.0 || 11.2 || 4.1 || 1.0
|- style="background-color: #EAEAEA"
! scope="row" style="text-align:center" | 1999
|style="text-align:center;"|
| 9 || 18 || 46 || 21 || 153 || 51 || 204 || 92 || 17 || 2.6 || 1.2 || 8.5 || 2.8 || 11.3 || 5.1 || 0.9
|-
! scope="row" style="text-align:center" | 2000
|style="text-align:center;"|
| 9 || 21 || 24 || 19 || 201 || 67 || 268 || 126 || 23 || 1.1 || 0.9 || 9.6 || 3.2 || 12.8 || 6.0 || 1.1
|- style="background-color: #EAEAEA"
! scope="row" style="text-align:center" | 2001
|style="text-align:center;"|
| 9 || 22 || 38 || 34 || 206 || 61 || 267 || 132 || 21 || 1.7 || 1.5 || 9.4 || 2.8 || 12.1 || 6.0 || 1.0
|-
! scope="row" style="text-align:center" | 2002
|style="text-align:center;"|
| 9 || 24 || bgcolor="DD6E81"| 82 || bgcolor="CFECEC"| 38 || 178 || 50 || 228 || 132 || 23 || bgcolor="DD6E81"| 3.4 || bgcolor="CFECEC"| 1.6 || 7.4 || 2.1 || 9.5 || 5.5 || 1.0
|- style="background-color: #EAEAEA"
! scope="row" style="text-align:center" | 2003
|style="text-align:center;"|
| 9 || 22 || 65 || 28 || 147 || 38 || 185 || 101 || 22 || 3.0 || 1.3 || 6.7 || 1.7 || 8.4 || 4.6 || 1.0
|-
! scope="row" style="text-align:center" | 2004
|style="text-align:center;"|
| 9 || 21 || 69 || 47 || 155 || 32 || 187 || 99 || 19 || 3.3 || 2.2 || 7.4 || 1.5 || 8.9 || 4.7 || 0.9
|- style="background-color: #EAEAEA"
! scope="row" style="text-align:center" | 2005
|style="text-align:center;"|
| 9 || 18 || 39 || 23 || 118 || 27 || 145 || 67 || 20 || 2.2 || 1.3 || 6.6 || 1.5 || 8.1 || 3.7 || 1.1
|-
! scope="row" style="text-align:center" | 2006
|style="text-align:center;"|
| 9 || 21 || 68 || 26 || 163 || 41 || 204 || 106 || 16 || 3.2 || 1.2 || 7.8 || 2.0 || 9.7 || 5.0 || 0.8
|- style="background-color: #EAEAEA"
! scope="row" style="text-align:center" | 2007
|style="text-align:center;"|
| 9 || 15 || 26 || 16 || 100 || 33 || 133 || 68 || 6 || 1.7 || 1.1 || 6.7 || 2.2 || 8.9 || 4.5 || 0.4
|-
! scope="row" style="text-align:center" | 2008
|style="text-align:center;"|
| 9 || 5 || 3 || 5 || 27 || 8 || 35 || 20 || 4 || 0.6 || 1.0 || 5.4 || 1.6 || 7.0 || 4.0 || 0.8
|- class="sortbottom"
! colspan=3| Career
! 306
! 631
! 368
! 2455
! 836
! 3291
! 1502
! 268
! 2.1
! 1.2
! 8.0
! 2.7
! 10.8
! 4.9
! 0.9
|}

Honours and achievements

Individual
Keith 'Bluey' Truscott Medal: 2002
Coleman Medal: 2002
Melbourne F.C. Captain: 2000-2008
All-Australian: 1995, 2002
Melbourne F.C. Leading Goalkicker: 1996–1997, 1999, 2002–2004, 2006
Australian Representative Honours in International Rules Football: 1998, 2002
AFL Rising Star Nominee: 1993 (Round 6)

Retirement

Due to a broken disc in the back of his neck, and after playing only five games in 2008, he finally pulled the plug on his AFL career as he announced his immediate retirement on 19 May 2008. In the round nine 2008 match Melbourne vs Hawthorn after the match Neitz was given a standing ovation by the players and the fans. He ended his playing career with several Melbourne records that he'd broken during recent seasons, three in particular: Most games (one of only two players to play 300 games for Melbourne), most goals, and longest-serving captain.

References

External links

 

1975 births
All-Australians (AFL)
Australian rules footballers from Tasmania
Australian rules footballers from Victoria (Australia)
Coleman Medal winners
Victorian State of Origin players
Australian people of German descent
Living people
Melbourne Football Club players
Keith 'Bluey' Truscott Trophy winners
People from Ulverstone, Tasmania
Melbourne Football Club captains
Australia international rules football team players
Australian Football Hall of Fame inductees